The 2013 U.S. Open Grand Prix Gold was the seventh grand prix gold and grand prix tournament of the 2013 BWF Grand Prix Gold and Grand Prix. The tournament was held in Orange County Badminton Club, Orange, United States July 8 until July 13, 2013 and had a total purse of $120,000.

Men's singles

Seeds

  Boonsak Ponsana (semi-final)
  Hu Yun (quarter-final)
  Nguyen Tien Minh (champion)
  Wong Wing Ki (final)
  Takuma Ueda (quarter-final)
  Rajah Menuri Venkata Gurusaidutt (withdrew)
  Kazumasa Sakai (third round)
  Hsu Jen-hao (quarter-final)
  Niluka Karunaratne (withdrew)
  Eric Pang (second round)
  Tan Chun Seang (third round)
  Ramdan Misbun (third round)
  Kento Momota (semi-final)
  Suppanyu Avihingsanon (third round)
  Henri Hurskainen (third round)
  Joachim Persson (third round)

Finals

Top half

Section 1

Section 2

Section 3

Section 4

Bottom half

Section 5

Section 6

Section 7

Section 8

Women's singles

Seeds

  Nichaon Jindapon (semi-final)
  Yip Pui Yin (quarter-final)
  Sapsiree Taerattanachai (champion)
  Carolina Marín (first round)
  Yui Hashimoto (first round)
  Chan Tsz Ka (first round)
  Kaori Imabeppu (semi-final)
  Xing Aiying (quarter-final)

Finals

Top half

Section 1

Section 2

Bottom half

Section 3

Section 4

Men's doubles

Seeds

  Takeshi Kamura / Keigo Sonoda (champion)
  Maneepong Jongjit / Nipitphon Puangpuapech (semi-final)
  Hiroyuki Saeki / Ryota Taohata (withdrew)
  Phillip Chew / Sattawat Pongnairat (first round)
  Ruud Bosch / Koen Ridder (quarter-final)
  Adrian Liu / Derrick Ng (second round)
  Liang Jui-wei / Liao Kuan-hao (final)
  Jacco Arends / Jelle Maas (second round)

Finals

Top half

Section 1

Section 2

Bottom half

Section 3

Section 4

Women's doubles

Seeds

  Bao Yixin / Zhong Qianxin (champion)
  Yuriko Miki / Koharu Yonemoto (semi-final)
  Nicole Grether / Charmaine Reid (second round)
  Wang Rong / Zhang Zhibo (withdrew)

Finals

Top half

Section 1

Section 2

Bottom half

Section 3

Section 4

Mixed doubles

Seeds

  Lee Chun Hei / Chau Hoi Wah (champion)
  Phillip Chew / Jamie Subandhi (second round)
  Jorrit de Ruiter / Samantha Barning (quarter-final)
  Takeshi Kamura / Koharu Yonemoto (quarter-final)
  Ryota Taohata / Miyuki Maeda (withdrew)
  Lee Hock Lai /  Phyllis Chan (first round)
  Nyl Yakura / Grace Gao (withdrew)
  Lino Munoz / Cynthia Gonzalez (first round)

Finals

Top half

Section 1

Section 2

Bottom half

Section 3

Section 4

References

U.S. Open Badminton Championships
U.S. Open Grand Prix Gold
BWF Grand Prix Gold and Grand Prix
U.S. Open Grand Prix